Björn Anton Cajtoft (born 13 February 1994) is a Swedish professional footballer who plays as a goalkeeper for Norrby.

Club career
Cajtoft, the son of a goalkeeper, joined his local club, Bankeryds SK, when he was about five or six years old. He also represented the Småland region as a youth in national competitions. In 2008, he was invited to a youth summer camp with Jönköpings Södra, and he signed later that year.

He was promoted to the first-team squad in October 2012, and signed a one-year contract, with the intention of being a third-string keeper. He spent the entire 2012 Superettan season on the bench, but then made his team debut by playing the full 90 minutes during a win over GAIS on 2 November 2013, during the last match of the 2013 season. He shutout GAIS for a 1-0 win. Following this impressive performance, his contract was extended for two years in December.

Cajtoft started the 2014 season as the third-string keeper once again, but injuries to Niklas Helgesson and Damir Mehić made him the first choice for manager Jimmy Thelin. Once again, he proved himself worthy of a starting spot and played in 27 matches between the sticks that year. The following season, he and Mehic shared goalkeeping duties. Cajtoft appeared in 19 games and recording four shutouts. J-Södra finished as league champions and were promoted to Allsvenskan for the 2016 season. Cajtoft made his first division debut during the season opener on 2 April against Kalmar, recording yet another shutout in a 1-0 win. It was J-Södra's first top-division victory in 47 years.

On 8 January 2021, Cajtoft signed a contract with Norrby for 2 years with an option for a third year.

International career
Cajtoft was selected to play with the Swedish under-19 team in a friendly against Finland on 10 October 2014 in Uppsala. They lost 1-0. The following month, on 14 November, he made his debut for the Swedish U21 team. Facing Cyprus, they tied 1-1, and then won 5-3 after penalties.

In August 2015, Cajtoft was among the 22 players named to the Swedish under-21 team for the 2017 UEFA European Under-21 Championship qualifying tournament. As of 30 May he has been the starting keeper in all five group matches, recording four shutouts.

Honours

Club
Jönköpings Södra
 Superettan: 2015

References

External links

 
 
 

Living people
1994 births
Swedish footballers
Sweden youth international footballers
Sweden under-21 international footballers
Association football goalkeepers
Jönköpings Södra IF players
Norrby IF players
Allsvenskan players
Sportspeople from Jönköping
Superettan players